Netra  is a panchayat village in the state of Rajasthan, India.   Administratively, Netra is under Sumerpur Tahsil of Pali District in Rajasthan. The village of Netra is located on National Highway 14, 8 km by road northeast of the town of Sumerpur, and 65 km by road south-southwest of the city of Pali.

There are three villages in the Netara gram panchayat: Netra, Parakhiya, and Rojra.

Demographics 
In the 2001 census, the village of Netra had 1,870 inhabitants, with 952 males (50.9%) and 918 females (49.1%), for a gender ratio of 964 females per thousand males.

Notes

External links 
 

Villages in Pali district